Edouard Weckx (born 15 May 1945) is a Belgian racing cyclist. He rode in the 1968 Tour de France.

References

1945 births
Living people
Belgian male cyclists
Place of birth missing (living people)